Clinical scientist may refer to:

 Biomedical scientist
 Clinical laboratory scientist
 Healthcare scientist

See also 
 Clinical pathologist
 Clinical biologist
 Medical laboratory

fr:Scientifiques biomédicaux